Clifton railway station is a railway station in Clifton, Greater Manchester, England which was formerly called Clifton Junction. It lies on the Manchester–Preston line.

History
It opened to the public on 28 September 1846, by which time the MB&RR had amalgamated with other companies to become the East Lancashire Railway, and the M&BR had itself amalgamated with the Manchester and Leeds Railway; the M&LR became the Lancashire and Yorkshire Railway in 1847.

The Bury line ran northward from the junction, crossing the Irwell Valley on the Clifton Viaduct (known locally as the "13 arches"), to run on the opposite side of the valley from the Bolton line. A station at the junction, with two platforms for each route (Bolton or Bury), opened in June 1847, and was named Clifton Junction.

The line to Bury closed in 1966, but the viaduct remains a Grade II listed local landmark.
 
On 6 May 1974 the station was renamed Clifton, (even though the area has become known as Clifton Junction), and in the 1990s the service was reduced to one train per day in each direction.

Local industry made good use of Clifton Junction railway station long before the advent of mass car ownership when three factories were established close by enabling employees and visitors access by train. The three factories were Magnesium Elektron Ltd, Chloride Batteries Ltd and Pilkington's Tiles Ltd.

Services
In 2012, the station had only a small amount of services day in each direction (local services run by Northern); only 170 passengers were recorded as using the station in 2010–11. The single daily service each way was suspended between May 2015 and the December 2015 timetable change due to the ongoing modernisation work at Farnworth Tunnel, with a replacement bus provided instead. The station reopened on schedule on 14 December 2015.

Electric service commenced on Monday 11 February 2019, initially utilising Class 319 electric multiple units however all services calling at Clifton are operated utilising Diesel multiple units.

There is no Sunday service.

References

External links

 History of the Liverpool and Manchester Railway with mention of Molyneux Junction
 Images of Clifton line, including a reference to Molyneux Brow Station

Railway stations in Salford
DfT Category F2 stations
Former Lancashire and Yorkshire Railway stations
Railway stations in Great Britain opened in 1847
Northern franchise railway stations
Low usage railway stations in the United Kingdom
1847 establishments in England